Robert Henderson is an American politician.

Early career
Henderson moved to Sioux City, Iowa, in 1989, to accept an assistant coaching position for the Morningside Mustangs football team. He subsequently worked for Penn Corp Financial, before teaching within the Sioux City Community School District.

Political career
Henderson worked for Chuck Grassley as a regional director. He contested a Sioux City School Board election in 2015. This was Henderson's first candidacy for public office. He finished seventh of seven candidates. Shortly after the election, board member Paul Speidel resigned his seat, and Henderson was one of five candidates considered for appointment to the board. Former board member John Meyers was eventually selected.

Henderson campaigned for the District 14 seat in the Iowa House of Representatives in 2016 and 2018, losing both times to Tim Kacena. In 2020, he mounted a third campaign for the district, this time losing to Steve Hansen. In January 2021, Henderson succeeded Suzan Stewart as chair of the Woodbury County branch of the Republican Party. He faced Hansen, who had been redistricted to District 2, for a second time in the 2022 general election, and won the seat.

References

20th-century American educators
Living people
Schoolteachers from Iowa
Politicians from Sioux City, Iowa
Morningside Mustangs football coaches
Republican Party members of the Iowa House of Representatives
21st-century American politicians
Year of birth missing (living people)